Ryan Fraser (born 24 February 1994) is a Scottish professional footballer who plays as a winger for Premier League club Newcastle United and the Scotland national team. He has previously played for Aberdeen, AFC Bournemouth and Ipswich Town. He represented the Scotland under-19 and under-21 team, and made his full international debut in June 2017.

Club career

Aberdeen
Fraser signed for Aberdeen in May 2010, aged 16, after leaving Kincorth Academy. He made his debut for the first team against Heart of Midlothian in October 2010. Fraser made a significant impression in the Aberdeen first team during the early part of the 2012–13 Scottish Premier League season, winning the Young Player of the Month award for September and October 2012. Aberdeen manager Craig Brown expressed concerns at this time that opposing teams were targeting Fraser with tough tackling. Fraser rejected a contract extension with Aberdeen on 7 December 2012.

AFC Bournemouth
Fraser signed a three-year contract with League One club AFC Bournemouth on 18 January 2013. Bournemouth paid Aberdeen a transfer fee of £400,000 to complete the deal. During his first season, Fraser helped Bournemouth gain promotion to the Championship. After Bournemouth were promoted to the Premier League in 2015, Fraser was loaned to Championship club Ipswich Town for the 2015–16 season.

Fraser scored his first Premier League goal on 4 December 2016, in a 4–3 win against Liverpool. He entered the game as a second-half substitute, when Bournemouth trailed 2–0. Fraser won a penalty kick for the first Bournemouth goal, scored the second and provided an assist for the third goal.

Fraser scored both Bournemouth goals in a 2–1 win against Everton on 30 December 2017. He ranked highly in the assists chart during the 2018–19 Premier League season with 14 assists and 7 goals, leading to transfer speculation linking him with a move to Arsenal. No summer move materialised and Fraser admitted in January 2020 that this speculation had caused a decline in his performances during the 2019–20 season. With his contract due to expire on 30 June 2020, Fraser rejected the offer of a short-term extension to play the rest of Bournemouth's matches in the 2019–20 season, which was interrupted by the coronavirus pandemic, as he did not want to risk injury. Manager Eddie Howe later confirmed that Fraser would not play for the club again.

Newcastle United

On 7 September 2020, Fraser joined Newcastle United on a five-year contract. He made his debut for the club on 15 September 2020, scoring the winner in a 1–0 victory over Blackburn Rovers in the EFL Cup. After Steve Bruce was sacked by the club, and replaced by Eddie Howe, Fraser garnered increased playing time in the second half of the 2021–22 season, helping Newcastle to avoid relegation with an 11th placed finish. His playing time was reduced during the 2022–23 season, with his last appearance coming on 19 October. In March 2023 he was training with the club's under-21 squad, and Eddie Howe said that he had done this in order to concentrate on players who were "committed" to the club and that he didn't think Fraser had a future there.

International career 
Fraser was first called up to the senior Scotland squad in March 2017. He made his international debut in June 2017, appearing as a substitute in a 2–2 draw with England.

In March 2019, Fraser missed a UEFA Euro 2020 qualifying match against Kazakhstan due to the Kazakhs using an artificial playing surface. Scotland lost 3–0, and Fraser was criticised by former Scotland player Darren Fletcher for showing a lack of commitment to the national team. Fraser said he had previously suffered two serious injuries while playing on artificial surfaces, and that the decision not to play had been agreed with both the national team and his club side Bournemouth. In November 2019 he was one of three Scotland players to withdraw from the national squad due to injury.

Fraser scored the goal in a 1–0 win against the Czech Republic on 14 October 2020.

Style of play
Primarily deployed as a winger on the left flank, Fraser is a right-footed player described by his compatriot Charlie Nicholas as an "old-fashioned type of player" and a "little pocket dynamo" for the muscular physique he has developed to "take the knocks and kicks that come his way." Fraser has occasionally played in the right-back position for both club and country. He had previously been utilised in a central midfield role for Newcastle, but has most recently been played by manager Eddie Howe as a winger on the right flank, in a 4-3-3 formation.

Career statistics

Club

International

Scores and results list Scotland's goal tally first, score column indicates score after each Fraser goal.

Honours
AFC Bournemouth
Football League Championship: 2014–15

Individual
Scottish Premier League Young Player of the Month: September 2012, October 2012
EFL Young Player of the Month: August 2015
AFC Bournemouth Supporters' Player of the Year: 2018–19
AFC Bournemouth Players' Player of the Year: 2018–19

References

External links

1994 births
Living people
Footballers from Aberdeen
Scottish footballers
Scotland youth international footballers
Scotland under-21 international footballers
Scotland international footballers
Association football wingers
Aberdeen F.C. players
AFC Bournemouth players
Ipswich Town F.C. players
Newcastle United F.C. players
Scottish Premier League players
English Football League players
Premier League players
UEFA Euro 2020 players